Graptophyllum excelsum, the scarlet fuchsia, is a shrub in the family Acanthaceae. It is native to Queensland, Australia, often found on limestone on the edges of monsoon forest and vine thickets. The attractive flowers and adaptable nature make this plant suitable as an ornamental garden plant.

References

excelsum
Flora of Queensland
Taxa named by Ferdinand von Mueller